Samuel J. Ramsperger (April 25, 1862 Buffalo, New York – December 15, 1936) was an American politician from New York.

Life
He was the son of Conrad Ramsperger (1831–1869), a nailsmith who died in a work accident, and Anna Maria (Reppert) Ramsperger. He attended St. Anne's Parochial School and Canisius College. Then he became a bookkeeper. He was an alderman of Buffalo from 1885 to 1888. On November 20, 1889, he married Anna Siebert.

Ramsperger was a member of the New York State Senate (48th D.) from 1899 to 1904, sitting in the 122nd, 123rd, 124th, 125th, 126th and 127th New York State Legislatures.

He was again a member of the State Senate (49th D.) from 1907 to 1920, sitting in the 130th, 131st, 132nd, 133rd, 134th, 135th, 136th, 137th, 138th, 139th, 140th, 141st, 142nd and 143rd New York State Legislatures.

He died on December 15, 1936, "after an illness of three months", and was buried at the United German and French Roman Catholic Cemetery in Cheektowaga, New York.

Sources
 Official New York from Cleveland to Hughes by Charles Elliott Fitch (Hurd Publishing Co., New York and Buffalo, 1911, Vol. IV; pg. 365ff)
 Bio transcribed from Our County and Its People: A Descriptive Work on Erie County, New York by Truman C. White (1898)
 Memorial and Family History of Erie County, New York (Vol. II, 1906–08; pg. 5ff)
 SAMUEL J. RAMSPERGER in NYT on December 16, 1936 (subscription required)

External links
 

1862 births
1936 deaths
Democratic Party New York (state) state senators
Politicians from Buffalo, New York
New York (state) city council members
Canisius College alumni